Early is a city in Sac County, Iowa, United States. The population was 587 at the 2020 census.

History
Early was incorporated on May 22, 1883, and is named after D.C. Early, a local settler.

Geography
Early is located at  (42.461903, -95.151290).

Demographics

Early's "claim to fame" is that it is the Crossroads of the Nation, because U.S. Highway 71 and U.S. Route 20 intersect there.

2010 census
As of the census of 2010, there were 557 people, 246 households, and 146 families living in the city. The racial makeup of the city was 93.2% White, 1.4% African American, 0.2% Native American, 0.2% Asian, 0.5% Pacific Islander, 3.1% from other races, and 1.4% from two or more races. Hispanic or Latino of any race were 4.5% of the population.

There were 246 households, of which 27.6% had children under the age of 18 living with them, 47.6% were married couples living together, 9.3% had a female householder with no husband present, 2.4% had a male householder with no wife present, and 40.7% were non-families. 34.6% of all households were made up of individuals, and 13% had someone living alone who was 65 years of age or older. The average household size was 2.26 and the average family size was 2.95.

The median age in the city was 40.9 years. 25.5% of residents were under the age of 18; 6.3% were between the ages of 18 and 24; 24% were from 25 to 44; 27.7% were from 45 to 64; and 16.5% were 65 years of age or older. The gender makeup of the city was 49.4% male and 50.6% female.

2000 census
As of the census of 2000, there were 605 people, 258 households, and 166 families living in the city. The racial makeup of the city was 96.03% White, 0.66% African American, 0.17% Native American, 2.31% from other races, and 0.83% from two or more races. Hispanic or Latino of any race were 4.13% of the population.

There were 258 households, out of which 32.6% had children under the age of 18 living with them, 56.2% were married couples living together, 7.0% had a female householder with no husband present, and 35.3% were non-families. 32.9% of all households were made up of individuals, and 15.5% had someone living alone who was 65 years of age or older. The average household size was 2.34 and the average family size was 2.97.

27.8% were under the age of 18, 8.3% from 18 to 24, 27.1% from 25 to 44, 18.3% from 45 to 64, and 18.5% were 65 years of age or older. The median age was 37 years. For every 100 females, there were 86.2 males. For every 100 females age 18 and over, there were 86.0 males.

The median income for a household in the city was $30,972, and the median income for a family was $40,521. Males had a median income of $27,778 versus $18,929 for females. The per capita income for the city was $14,317. About 8.1% of families and 12.1% of the population were below the poverty line, including 12.0% of those under age 18 and 9.4% of those age 65 or over.

Education
Early is a part of the Schaller-Crestland Community School District. The district formed on July 1, 1993, by the merger of the Schaller Community School District and the Crestland Community School District. Schaller-Crestland's nickname is the Wildcats, and their school colors are black, white, and gold. 

Prior to consolidation with Nemaha, the Early Community School District had been known as the Cardinals, and their school colors were red and black. In 1958, the Early Community School and the Nemaha Community School merged to become the Crestland Community School District. The new district adopted the Cadets as their nickname, and their school colors were black and white. Nemaha had been known as the Bluejays; their school colors were blue and white.

In 2010, Schaller-Crestland began whole grade sharing with Galva-Holstein School district. The elementary schools stayed separated, with students going to Schaller, Galva and Holstein respectively. Grades 6-8 were moved from Galva and Schaller respectively to the Early high school. Grades 9-12 were moved to Holstein's High School. Their Mascot is now the Raptors and their School Colors are Black, Gold and Orange.

Song

The city is the topic of the song "Early", by folk musician Greg Brown.  It appears on his album 44 & 66, released in 1980.

Murder of Dustin Wehde
In August 2011, Tracey Ann Richter was charged with first-degree murder and was convicted by a jury in November 2011. On June 1, 2012, Dateline NBC aired a two-hour episode titled "Twisted", about the 2001 shooting death of Early resident Dustin Wehde. Tracey Richter, a neighbor of Wehde's, was convicted of first-degree murder on November 7, 2011 and sentenced to life in prison without the possibility of parole [Case No. FECR011900]. Richter appealed her conviction.  On January 9, 2013, the Iowa Court of Appeals upheld the conviction of Tracey Ann Richter.

References

External links
 City of Early, Iowa Website Portal style website, Government, Business, Library, Recreation and more
 City-Data.com Comprehensive Statistical Data and more about Early

Cities in Iowa
Cities in Sac County, Iowa